Faxonius is a genus of freshwater crayfish in the family Cambaridae. There are more than 90 described species in Faxonius. It includes the rusty crayfish, an invasive species in North America, and three species, F. virilis, F. immunis, and F. limosus, that are invasive to Europe.

This genus was formerly considered a subgenus of Orconectes. Several former Orconectes species were added to this genus in 2017, leaving only the cave dwelling species unchanged, however F. stygocaneyi was reallocated, even though it lives in caves.

Species
These species belong to the genus Faxonius:

 Faxonius acares (Fitzpatrick, 1965)
 Faxonius alabamensis (Faxon, 1884)
 Faxonius alluvius (Simon & McMurray, 2014)
 Faxonius barrenensis (Rhoades, 1944)
 Faxonius bellator (Bloom, McCall, Schuster & Blanton, 2019)
 Faxonius bisectus (Rhoades, 1944)
 Faxonius burri (Taylor & Sabaj, 1998)
 Faxonius carolinensis (Cooper & Cooper, 1995)
 Faxonius castaneus (Johnson, 2010)
 Faxonius causeyi (Jester, 1967)
 Faxonius chickasawae (Cooper & Hobbs, 1980)
 Faxonius compressus (Faxon, 1884)
 Faxonius cooperi (Cooper & Hobbs, 1980)
 Faxonius cristavarius (Taylor, 2000)
 Faxonius cyanodigitus (Johnson, 2010)
 Faxonius deanae (Reimer & Jester, 1975)
 Faxonius difficilis (Faxon, 1898)
 Faxonius durelli (Bouchard & Bouchard, 1995)
 Faxonius elix (Couch & Hayes, 2022)
 Faxonius erichsonianus (Faxon, 1898)
 Faxonius etnieri (Bouchard & Bouchard, 1976)
 Faxonius eupunctus (Williams, 1952)
 Faxonius forceps (Faxon, 1884)
 Faxonius harrisonii (Faxon, 1884)
 Faxonius hartfieldi (Fitzpatrick & Suttkus, 1992)
 Faxonius hathawayi
 Faxonius hathawayi blacki (Walls, 1972)
 Faxonius hathawayi hathawayi (Penn, 1952)
 Faxonius hobbsi (Penn, 1950)
 Faxonius holti (Cooper & Hobbs, 1980)
 Faxonius hylas (Faxon, 1890)
 Faxonius illinoiensis (Brown, 1956)
 Faxonius immunis (Hagen, 1870)
 Faxonius indianensis (Hay, 1896)
 Faxonius jeffersoni (Rhoades, 1944)
 Faxonius jonesi (Fitzpatrick, 1992)
 Faxonius juvenilis (Hagen, 1870)
 Faxonius kentuckiensis (Rhoades, 1944)
 Faxonius lancifer (Hagen, 1870)
 Faxonius leptogonopodus (Hobbs, 1948)
 Faxonius limosus (Rafinesque, 1817)
 Faxonius longidigitus (Faxon, 1898)
 Faxonius luteus (Creaser, 1933)
 Faxonius macrus (Williams, 1952)
 Faxonius maletae (Walls, 1972)
 Faxonius marchandi (Hobbs, 1948)
 Faxonius margorectus (Taylor, 2002)
 Faxonius medius (Faxon, 1884)
 Faxonius meeki
 Faxonius meeki brevis (Williams, 1952)
 Faxonius meeki meeki (Faxon, 1898)
 Faxonius menae (Creaser, 1933)
 Faxonius mirus (Ortmann, 1931)
 Faxonius mississippiensis (Faxon, 1884)
 Faxonius nais (Faxon, 1885)
 Faxonius nana (Williams, 1952)
 Faxonius neglectus
 Faxonius neglectus chaenodactylus (Williams, 1952)
 Faxonius neglectus neglectus (Faxon, 1885)
 Faxonius obscurus (Hagen, 1870)
 Faxonius occidentalis (Johnson, 2010)
 Faxonius ozarkae (Williams, 1952)
 Faxonius pagei (Taylor & Sabaj, 1997)
 Faxonius palmeri
 Faxonius palmeri creolanus (Creaser, 1933)
 Faxonius palmeri longimanus (Faxon, 1898)
 Faxonius palmeri palmeri (Faxon, 1884)
 Faxonius pardalotus (Wetzel, Poly & Fetzner, 2005)
 Faxonius perfectus (Walls, 1972)
 Faxonius peruncus (Creaser, 1931)
 Faxonius placidus (Hagen, 1870)
 Faxonius propinquus (Girard, 1852)
 Faxonius punctimanus (Creaser, 1933)
 Faxonius putnami (Faxon, 1884)
 Faxonius quadruncus (Creaser, 1933)
 Faxonius quinebaugensis (Mathews & Warren, 2008)
 Faxonius rafinesquei (Rhoades, 1944)
 Faxonius raymondi (Thoma & Stocker, 2009)
 Faxonius rhoadesi (Hobbs, 1949)
 Faxonius ronaldi (Taylor, 2000)
 Faxonius roberti (Fetzner & Taylor, 2018)
 Faxonius rusticus (Girard, 1852)
 Faxonius sanbornii
 Faxonius sanbornii erismophorous (Hobbs & Fitzpatrick, 1962)
 Faxonius sanbornii sanbornii (Faxon, 1884)
 Faxonius saxatilis (Bouchard & Bouchard, 1976)
 Faxonius shoupi (Hobbs, 1948)
 Faxonius sloanii (Bundy in Forbes, 1876)
 Faxonius spinosus (Bundy, 1877)
 Faxonius stannardi (Page, 1985)
 Faxonius stygocaneyi (Hobbs III, 2001)
 Faxonius taylori (Schuster, 2008)
 Faxonius texanus (Johnson, 2010)
 Faxonius theaphionensis (Simon, Timm & Morris, 2005)
 Faxonius transfuga (Fitzpatrick, 1966)
 Faxonius tricuspis (Rhoades, 1944)
 Faxonius validus (Faxon, 1914)
 Faxonius virginiensis (Hobbs, 1951)
 Faxonius virilis (Hagen, 1870)
 Faxonius wagneri (Fetzner & Taylor, 2018)
 Faxonius williamsi (Fitzpatrick, 1966)
 Faxonius wrighti (Hobbs, 1948)
 Faxonius yanahlindus (Taylor, Rhoden & Schuster, 2016)

See also

 Faxonella, a genus of crayfish

References

Further reading

External links

Cambaridae
Taxa named by Arnold Edward Ortmann